Jacques Cachemire (born 27 February 1947 in Pointe-a-Pitre, Guadeloupe) is a French former professional basketball player and coach. At a height of 1.97 m (6'5 ") tall, he played at the small forward and power forward positions. He was inducted into the French Basketball Hall of Fame, in 2007. He was awarded the Glory of Sport in 2016.

Club career
Cachemire was a member of the FIBA European Selection, in 1974, 1975, and 1979. He won the French League championship in 1970 and 1980. He was the French League Best Scorer, in 1975

National team career
Cachemire had 250 caps with the senior men's French national basketball team, from 1969 to 1983. He scored 2,837 points with the senior French national team.

He played at 6 EuroBaskets: 1971, 1973, 1977, 1979, 1981, and 1983.

References

External links
FIBA Profile
FIBA Europe Profile

1947 births
Living people
French basketball coaches
French men's basketball players
French people of Guadeloupean descent
Olympique Antibes basketball players
Power forwards (basketball)
Small forwards
Stade Auto Lyon players
Union Tours Basket Métropole players
Mediterranean Games medalists in basketball
Mediterranean Games silver medalists for France
Competitors at the 1975 Mediterranean Games